Penncrest High School is a public four-year comprehensive high school in Middletown Township, Delaware County, Pennsylvania in the Philadelphia metropolitan area. It is a part of the Rose Tree Media School District. 

The district, and therefore the high school's attendance boundary, includes the following municipalities: Middletown Township, Media, Edgmont Township, and Upper Providence Township.

Extracurricular activities

Clubs and societies

Honor Societies
National Honor Society
Mu Alpha Theta (National Math Honor Society)
Rho Kappa (History Honor Society)
Pi Lambda Sigma (English Honor Society)
World Language Honor Society
Science National Honor Society

Clubs
Emanon, theatre club
Filming South & Lincoln
World Language Honors Club
Lion's Paw Society
The Gryphon (literary magazine)
Future Business Leaders of America (FBLA)
Model UN
Debate Club 
Improv Club
Chess Club
Medical Scholars Club
Gay Straight Alliance
Asian Club
Fair Trade Club

Academic teams
Hi-Q - the oldest academic quiz competition in the United States, began in 1948. Delco Champions (1999, 2000, 2003, 2009, 2010, 2013, 2015), National Champions (2015)
Envirothon - PA State Champions (2000, 2002, 2004, 2005, 2006, 2008, 2009, 2010, 2011, 2014, 2015, 2016, 2017), North American Champions (2000, 2005, 2009, 2017)
Physics Olympics - a regional competition combining problem solving and various construction oriented competitions. Penncrest holds two national records for consecutive championships and consecutive meets won
Science Olympiad - PA State Champions (2014), PA State 2nd Place finalists (2004, 2005, 2006, 2007, 2008, 2009, 2010, 2011, 2013); National results: 8th in 2004; 11th in 2005; 5th in 2006; 7th in 2007; 8th in 2008; 6th in 2009; 4th in 2010; 4th in 2011; 14th in 2013; 8th in 2014

Music

Concert Band
Wind Ensemble
Roaring Lions Marching Band 
Orchestra
Choir
Jazz Band
Jazz Lab
Indoor Drumline
Indoor Color Guard
Symphonic Orchestra
Pit Orchestra

Sports

For the 2018–2019 school year. Penncrest competed in 12 interscholastic boys sports and 11 girls sports including boys baseball, basketball, cross country running, American football, golf, indoor and outdoor track and field, lacrosse, soccer, swimming and diving,  tennis, and wrestling. Girls competed in basketball, cross country running, field hockey, indoor and outdoor  track and field, lacrosse, softball, soccer, swimming and diving, tennis, and volleyball. Penncrest competes in the Central League, District One, of the Pennsylvania Interscholastic Athletic Association (PIAA).

In 2005, the ice hockey team won the state championship. In 2014, the boys lacrosse team won the PIAA state championship.

Curriculum 
Penncrest High School offers a variety of courses in a wide range of academic subject areas. Students are able to study courses in Art, Business Education, ESL, Family & Consumer Sciences, English, Mathematics, Music, Physical Education & Health, Science, Social Studies, Special Education, Technology Education, and World Languages.  More than 200 courses and 17 AP programs are offered.  
The rigor of courses at the school follows a four level setup: Advanced Placement (AP), Accelerated, Honors, and College Prep. Many juniors and seniors challenge themselves in the numerous Advanced Placement courses offered by the school. These include: AP English Language & Composition, AP English Literature & Composition, AP Calculus AB, AP Calculus BC, AP Statistics, AP Music Theory & Composition, AP Biology, AP Chemistry, AP Environmental Science, AP Physics 1, AP Physics C: Mechanics, AP US History, AP European History, AP Microeconomics, AP Macroeconomics, AP US Government & Politics, AP French Language, AP Chinese Language, and AP Spanish Language, and AP Capstone (AP Seminar and AP Research). In the 2010–2011 school year, Penncrest also added Mandarin Chinese to its course offerings, attracting enough students to fill two classes. Since the 2013 school year, sophomores have been permitted to take select AP courses including AP Physics 1, AP Statistics, AP seminar, and AP European History.

Notable alumni
Jeff Ayars, American filmmaker and actor
Stephen Bloom, a Representative of Pennsylvania in the US House of Representatives.
Paul DiMeo, cast member of Extreme Makeover: Home Edition
Michael A. O'Donnell, Ph.D., award-winning author and international scholar.
Kenneth A. Oye, political science professor at MIT and early contributor to regime theory.
Robert Engle, American economist and the winner of the 2003 Sveriges Riksbank Prize in Economic Sciences in Memory of Alfred Nobel.
Ronald Yeaw, US Navy SEAL and former commander of Seal Team Six
Auston Trusty, professional soccer player for the Colorado Rapids
Jonah Jackson, NFL player for the Detroit Lions.
Bill Whitaker, television journalist and a correspondent on the CBS News program 60 Minutes.

References

External links
Penncrest High School

Middletown Township, Delaware County, Pennsylvania
Public high schools in Pennsylvania
Educational institutions established in 1955
Schools in Delaware County, Pennsylvania
1955 establishments in Pennsylvania